The Valea Vladului is a left tributary of the river Dâmbovița in Romania. It discharges into the Dâmbovița in the Făgăraș Mountains.

References

Rivers of Romania
Rivers of Argeș County